Wind Pudding Lake State Natural Area is a Wisconsin Department of Natural Resources-designated State Natural Area featuring the 180-acre Wind Pudding Lake, its associated wetlands, and some of its surrounding uplands. The lake is noteworthy for its separate basins, each having distinctive characteristics. This basin contains a well-developed population of sterile-rosette aquatic vegetation, with several species considered either rare, or with a restricted range within the State of Wisconsin, such as the plantain shoreweed (Littorella uniflora). The central and western basins are much shallower and muck-bottomed, with extensive areas covered by a mat of floating peat, which supports a dense growth of aquatic vegetation, including sundew (Drosera intermedia), purple bladderwort (Utricularia purpurea), yellow-eyed grass (Xyris montana), and the rare Robbin's spike-rush (Eleocharis robbinsii).  \The western basin does have some development, with several houses, while the rest of the lake is undeveloped.

Location and access 
To reach the lake via public lands, follow Bass Rd. south, off Bluebird Ln. After , the road forks - the right fork leads to the central basin, while the left fork leads to the eastern basin.

References

External links 
Wind Pudding Lake State Natural Area
Bathymetric Map
Google Map of Wind Pudding Lake State Natural Area

Protected areas established in 1983
Protected areas of Oneida County, Wisconsin
State Natural Areas of Wisconsin
Lakes of Wisconsin
Landforms of Oneida County, Wisconsin
1983 establishments in Wisconsin